is a rapid transit station in Toyohira-ku, Sapporo, Hokkaido, Japan. The station number is H14. It is the southern terminus of the Tōhō Line.

The Sapporo Dome is about 10 minutes walking distance south of the station.

Platforms

Surrounding area
Sapporo Dome
Tsukisamu Dome
Japan National Route 36 (to Muroran)
Yamada Denki department store
Ito-Yokado supermarket

 

Railway stations in Japan opened in 1994
Railway stations in Sapporo
Sapporo Municipal Subway
Toyohira-ku, Sapporo